The 17th Paloma O'Shea International Piano Competition took place in the Festival Palace of Santander, Spain from July 27 to August 8, 2012. Twenty pianists from ten countries took part in the competition. For the fifth time the First Prize was not awarded; Ahn Ah-ruem won the Second Prize while Tamar Beraia and János Palojtay shared the Third Prize. Beraia was awarded the Audience Prize.

Jury
 Antoni Ros Marbà (chairman)
 Peter Alward (vice-chairman)
 Luis Pereira Leal (vice-chairman)
 Lorenzo Fasolo
 Ralf Gothóni
 Márta Gulyás
 Elisabeth Leonskaja
 Oleg Maisenberg
 Tomás Marco
 Ferenc Rados
 Gérard Wyss
 Jenő Nyári (preselection)
 Luis Fernando Pérez (preselection)

Results

References

Santander, Spain
Paloma O'Shea International Piano Competition
2012 in Spanish music
July 2012 events in Europe
August 2012 events in Europe